Ian Hislop's Stiff Upper Lip: An Emotional History of Britain is a series of reality television programs originally made in the United Kingdom in 2012.  The show involves Private Eye editor Ian Hislop narrating through Victorian England and how they bottled up or let out their feelings, influencing British history. It has since been copied for UK sequels and in the United States and Australia.

The documentary consists of three episodes of around 55 minutes each. The presenter explores a range of aspects of Victorian Britain as well as returning to his former school, Ardingly College, where he explains the effect of the English public school in shaping men.

Episodes

See also
 Stiff upper lip

Notes

References

External links
 

2000s British documentary television series
2000s British reality television series
2012 British television series debuts
2012 British television series endings
BBC television documentaries
English-language television shows